Joseph Trumbull may refer to:
Joseph Trumbull (commissary general) (1737–1778), Connecticut army officer in the American Revolution
Joseph Trumbull (governor) (1782–1861), U.S. Governor of Connecticut